The 1944 National Invitation Tournament was the 1944 edition of the annual NCAA college basketball competition.

Selected teams
Below is a list of the 8 teams selected for the tournament.

 Bowling Green
 Canisius
 DePaul
 Kentucky
 Muhlenberg
 Oklahoma A&M
 St. John's
 Utah

Bracket
Below is the tournament bracket.

References

National Invitation
National Invitation Tournament
1940s in Manhattan
Basketball in New York City
College sports in New York City
Madison Square Garden
National Invitation Tournament
National Invitation Tournament
Sports competitions in New York City
Sports in Manhattan